Fryburg may refer to:

Fryburg, North Dakota, an unincorporated community in Billings County
Fryburg, Ohio, an unincorporated community in Auglaize County
Fryburg, Pennsylvania, an unincorporated community in Clarion County
Vryburg, a town in the North West province, South Africa, and pronounced as Fryburg in English

See also
Fryeburg (disambiguation)
Freyburg (disambiguation)